"Alan Bean" is a single by British indie rock band Hefner.  It was released on three formats by Too Pure in 2001.

The title song is about astronaut Alan Bean, who was the fourth person to walk on the Moon.  The band had the opportunity to speak to Bean as a surprise guest on Dutch broadcasting company VPRO.

All the tracks from all three formats were later included in the 2011 re-issue of the Dead Media album.

Track listing
The single was released on three formats.

CD1

 "Alan Bean"
 "Horror Show"
 "A Better Man"

CD2

 "Alan Bean"
 "Just Take Care"
 "Charlie Girl"

7"

 "Alan Bean" (Rothko remix)
 "Alan Bean" (Munit remix)

External links
 
 

Hefner (band) songs
2001 songs
Too Pure singles
Alan Bean